Paula Jai Parker is an American actress. She is best known for her supporting roles in the films Friday (1995), Sprung (1997), Why Do Fools Fall in Love (1998), Phone Booth (2002), Hustle & Flow (2005), and Idlewild (2006), and for her roles on television sitcoms The Wayans Bros. (1995-1996), Family Time (2012-2019), Hollywood Divas (2014-2016), Ray Donovan (2016), Black Jesus (2019), A House Divided (2019-2022), and Queen Sugar (2021). Parker is also known for her voice of Trudy Proud in the Disney Channel animated comedy series, The Proud Family (2001-2005), and also in the 2005 TV Movie The Proud Family Movie, and its 2022 reboot, The Proud Family: Louder and Prouder.

Early life
Parker was born and raised in Cleveland, Ohio, but moved to Washington, D.C. in 1987 to study at Howard University. After graduating with a Bachelor of Fine Arts degree, she moved to New York City and played a number of clubs. From 1992 to 1993, she performed on the FOX comedy program The Apollo Comedy Hour, filmed live at the legendary Apollo Theater, and later was cast member on the short-lived sketch show, Townsend Television.

Career
In 1995, Parker made her film debut in the F. Gary Gray urban comedy Friday. In the same year, she earned a Cable ACE Award for her role in the HBO anthology presentation, Cosmic Slop. Later that year, Parker returned to television in the WB sitcom, The Wayans Bros. opposite Shawn and Marlon Wayans. Throughout the 1990s, she appeared in several short-lived shows, including CBS sitcom The Weird Al Show (1997), and David E. Kelley's ABC comedy-drama, Snoops (1999).

During the 1990s, Parker had supporting roles in a number of films. She has appeared in the 1995 horror anthology Tales from the Hood, Spike Lee's Million Man March drama Get on the Bus (1996), the urban comedy Sprung (1997), Jada Pinkett Smith starring romantic comedy Woo (1997), the Frankie Lymon biography, Why Do Fools Fall in Love (1998). In the early 2000s, Parker co-starred in 30 Years to Life, High Crimes, Phone Booth, and My Baby's Daddy. In 2004, she played the lesbian woman in the LGBT comedy-drama, She Hate Me, and appeared as Ruth Brown in biographical film Ray. Her breakthrough was in the 2005 independent drama Hustle & Flow starring Terrence Howard. She later was cast opposite Howard in musical film Idlewild (2006).

From 2001 to 2005, Parker voiced the matriarch Trudy Proud in the Disney Channel animated comedy series, The Proud Family and its 2005 film The Proud Family Movie. She also played the role of Billie Holiday on the episode of Touched by an Angel in 2000, and later guest starred on The Shield, CSI: Crime Scene Investigation, My Name Is Earl, and The Mentalist. She co-starred in the 2007 thriller film Cover starring Aunjanue Ellis, and in later years worked in low-profile independent movies.

From 2013 to 2014, Parker had the recurring role in the HBO series, True Blood during show' seventh and final season. In 2014, she was cast as one of five leads on the TV One reality series, Hollywood Divas. In 2015, Parker was cast in the recurring roles on the Amazon drama Hand of God, and Freeform series, Recovery Road. In August 2016, she released an extended play entitled "Paula Jai & Friends", which featured the single "Going Down".

Personal life
Parker married Forrest Martin in 2004. The couple met on the set of Hustle & Flow, where Forrest, who had just graduated with a Master of Fine Arts, was working as an intern. She almost passed on shooting the critically acclaimed movie and only took the part at the urging of her manager. They have one son.

Discography
 Paula Jai & Friends (2016)

Filmography

Film and TV Movies

Television

Music Video

Documentary

Awards and nominations

References

External links

Living people
20th-century American actresses
21st-century American actresses
Actors from Shaker Heights, Ohio
Actresses from Cleveland
African-American actresses
American film actresses
American television actresses
American voice actresses
American web series actresses
Comedians from Ohio
Howard University alumni
20th-century African-American women
20th-century African-American people
21st-century African-American women
21st-century African-American people
Year of birth missing (living people)